Robert Sprague Beightler (March 21, 1892 – February 12, 1978) was an American military officer and Ohio political insider, engineer, and business owner.  In the military, he reached the rank of major general, and served as military governor of Okinawa, War Department General Staff, and as commander of the 37th Infantry Division, one of only two National Guard generals to lead their troops through training and into battle during World War II.  In political activities in Ohio, he served as head of the Ohio State Highway Department, president of the Army Personnel Board, executive director and board member of the Ohio Turnpike Commission.

Beightler was the only World War II National Guard general to have commanded his division for the length of the war.  In addition to being one of only eleven generals who commanded their divisions for the entire war and the longest-serving of these eleven, Beightler was appointed to the Regular Army in 1946 as one of only two National Guard major generals to receive such an appointment at that time.

Early life

Beightler was born on March 21, 1892, in Marysville, Ohio, of German-British-French descent. He was the son of William P. Beightler, an elected local surveyor, city and state engineer.  His father was also the president of the Perfect Cigar Company. His mother was Joana Sprague, daughter of Franklin B. Sprague and a cousin of Cdre. Oliver Hazard Perry, Gov. William Sprague IV, and U.S. Senator William Sprague III.

Beightler's paternal ancestors came from Germany, having immigrated to and settled in Berks County, Pennsylvania in the 18th century. In the early 19th century, those ancestors were some of the first pioneers of the western United States, first settling in eastern Ohio, and eventually in Marysville. They had served in the American Revolution, and would serve as well in the American Civil War, among other early United States conflicts.

Beightler was raised in a Protestant home that stressed church, community, service, duty, and patriotism. They lived on the westside of Marysville on 7th street. As a young man he learned from his father's industriousness and grew vegetables in the back yard to sell door to door. He was an excellent student, and avid hunter, having been quoted saying "from the time I was knee high to a grasshopper, (I had a rifle in my hands)."

Education
After graduating from Marysville High School in 1909, he enrolled at Ohio State University for two years. While there he studied civil engineering, was active in Sigma Alpha Epsilon, trained as a cadet, and was manager of the basketball team. Following the two years at OSU, Beightler left to take employment as an assistant engineer with Union County.

Marriage

While he was in college, he met his future wife Anna Lawrence Porter, who was a student at Ohio Wesleyan University. Her father was an executive with the Chesapeake and Potomac Telephone Company, and her grandfather was a judge in Union County. They would marry on October 14, 1914, and have three children, two who lived, Robert Jr., and Marjorie. Beightler's best man at this wedding was John W. Bricker, the future governor of Ohio, U.S. Senator, and 1944 Republican Vice Presidential Nominee.

Military service

National Guard enlistment
On August 7, 1911, Beightler had enlisted with the Ohio National Guard. He was part of the 4th Ohio Infantry, which had been re-organized from the 14th Ohio National Guard. Beightler served with Company E, based out of an armory in Marysville. By 1913 Beightler had achieved the rank of first sergeant, and second lieutenant by 1914.

Mexican conflict
In August 1916, President Woodrow Wilson mobilized 400,000 troops from across the nation, including from the Ohio National Guard, to be sent to the Mexican border to deal with the border crisis and Pancho Villa. The forces were led by John J. Pershing. The young Beightler served in this conflict.

World War I
On August 5, 1917, Beightler was commissioned as a first lieutenant in the U.S. Army, serving as an adjutant for the 3rd Battalion. The 4th infantry was designated the 166th U.S Infantry Regiment by the U.S. War Department. Beightler was moved to Camp Mills on Long Island in preparation for deployment to France in the European theater of World War I.

Before departing for Europe in October 1917, Anne visited to wish Robert well and inform him that they were expecting their first child. Upon arriving in France, Beightler's regiment undertook basic training operations, including learning the French language. He was involved in the Sedan incident, as well as other combat during his time in France.

Post-World War I civilian life
Following the war, he returned home to Ohio in 1919. Re-entering civilian life, he worked as an engineer for the state in Columbus over requests by his father to work in Union County as an engineer. His daughter was over a year old after he left the military, and the young family moved to Columbus to be closer to Beightler's employment.

Beightler completed his engineering degree at Ohio State University. He also started a private civil engineering firm with Adolph Stellhorn. He went on to Command and General Staff School in Leavenworth, Kansas, to complete a course on National Guard Officers where he was first in his class. In 1930, he graduated from the Army War College's G-2 course.

Return to active duty
In 1932, Beightler returned to active duty, serving with the Army General Staff in Washington D.C. This exposed him to the highest levels of the Army, something rarely afforded to National Guard officers. He spent most of his time working on plans for the Interstate Highway System.

In 1936 he returned to Ohio, working as chief of staff for the 37th Infantry Division, and commander of the 74th Infantry Brigade. Having earned the opportunity, in 1939 his longtime friend John W. Bricker, who had become Governor of Ohio, appointed Beightler to Ohio State Highway Director. In 1940, Bricker appointed Beightler commanding General of the 37th Infantry Division.

Training the 37th Infantry Division

Beightler assumed his duties as commanding General of the division in 1940, and immediately began exhaustive training and preparation of the soldiers. His philosophy was simple, the better trained the soldiers are, the fewer casualties there would be. He also had moral reasoning, having been quoted after World War II saying "... I have never been able to completely harden myself to the sacrifice of American lives. I have always felt a deep-seated responsibility to the families of these men, many of whom might be called my neighbors."

The 37th participated in the Louisiana Maneuvers, in which future senior military leaders Dwight Eisenhower, George Patton, Omar Bradley, and Leslie McNair were present. McNair said of Beightler that he was "one of the best" National Guard commanders. A few months later, America was thrown into World War II following the Pearl Harbor attacks.

World War II

Following the training of the 37th, Beightler would lead them into battle in the Pacific theater of the war. The "Buckeye Division," as the 37th was called, entered the theater in 1942. The 37th were victorious in numerous battles, including victories at New Georgia, Bougainville, the Battle of Manila, and raced the 33rd Division to liberate Baguio City. They would go on to liberate 1300 internees at the Bilibid Prison in Muntinlupa.

The Buckeye Division produced 7 Medal of Honor recipients during this war. They were demobilized in November 1945.

Japanese surrender
On September 5, 1945, Beightler accepted articles of surrender from Major General Iguchi, commanding general, 80th Brigade, Imperial Japanese Army, in Luzon, Philippines.

Postwar
At the end of the war, Beightler was the only World War II National Guard general to have commanded his division for the length of the war. In addition to being the army's longest serving division commander in 1945, Beightler was appointed to the regular army in 1946 as one of only two National Guard major generals to receive such an appointment at that time. Following the war, Beightler was assigned command of the 5th Service Command at Fort Hayes in Columbus. In 1947, he was appointed president of the personnel board of the Secretary of War, moving back to Washington. In 1949, he was assigned to the Far East, taking over the Marianas-Bonins Command on Guam.

Military Governor of Okinawa
In 1950, he was appointed the Deputy Military Governor of Okinawa, as well as the Deputy Governor of the Ryukyus Islands Command. During this period he dedicated most of his time toward rebuilding the infrastructure of the Ryukyus Islands. Following a massive heart attack in 1952, one of nine Beightler would suffer throughout his life, he was flown to Walter Reed Medical Center in Washington D.C. Beightler retired from the military after 42 years of service, in 1953.

Politics
Beightler had been involved in politics since his return from World War I. He was a lifelong critic of too much federal power, and constantly feuded with Washington in defending the National Guard. He was a staunch conservative in the classical liberal sense, believing in the freedom of the States and a skeptic of the federal government.

He was active in the Ohio Republican Party, having been a longtime friend of John W. Bricker, and close friends of Ohio Republican leader Ed Schorr and U.S. Senate Majority Leader and Presidential son Robert A. Taft. He had extensive media contacts that he used to the 37th's advantage in a dispute with the War Department in Washington, as well as to keep up on the political environment personally. At one point he was the mayor of Marble Cliff, Ohio, a tiny hamlet just outside downtown Columbus. He was an alternate delegate from the Ohio delegation to the 1940 Republican National Convention.

Gubernatorial and congressional consideration
In the spring of 1945 the Ohio Republican Party attempted to draft Beightler to run for governor against Frank Lausche in 1946. His candidacy was urged by Bricker, and Ohio Congressman Clarence J. Brown. This would have provided early key endorsements. Hundreds of insider Republicans wrote to Beightler stating he would have their support, would easily clinch the Republican nomination for governor, and could defeat Lausche.

However, citing the lack of a completely unified party around his potential candidacy, he did not want to cause a factional split in the party. He also cited the unlikelihood that he could beat Lausche who was a great campaigner, as well as the fact that he agreed with him on almost every issue. His decision was also influenced by the fact he was still engaged in battle in the Pacific theater.

He did write that ending his public career as governor of "the grand old state of Ohio" was an appealing prospect. Beightler miscalculated the political atmosphere, as Lausche would lose by 40,000 votes the following year in a banner year for Republicans.

In 1946, talks circulated again of Beightler running for political office, this time for Congress. However, he said was not interested in a legislative position and called it "a nobody's job."

Opposition to Eisenhower candidacy
On November 9, 1950, while stationed in the Pacific, he sent a letter to Robert A. Taft congratulating him on his Senate re-election victory.  The letter discussed a personal meeting with Gen. Douglas MacArthur on the subject, in which Beightler had encouraged MacArthur to run in '52, but MacArthur showed no interest.  MacArthur shared the same views as Beightler on Eisenhower, and both would go on to endorse Taft in 1952.  In Taft's reply on November 24, 1950, he implied to Beightler that Eisenhower was incompetent and likely to be influenced by money and political endorsements.

Ohio Turnpike Commission
After leaving the military in 1953, Beightler headed the Ohio Turnpike Commission as executive director. Beightler oversaw the construction and completion of the Ohio Turnpike. He resigned as executive director to become a member of the commission.

Retirement and family
Beightler retired officially in 1962 to Worthington, Ohio. Over the years he had been a good investor, and had a large retirement savings. He enjoyed gardening and fishing, and spent his winters in Florida. He followed national and international affairs closely, as well as Wall Street out of interest of his own financial holdings. He was also active in veterans and civic groups.

Beightler had two children with Anne, Robert Jr., who attended the United States Military Academy at West Point, and Marjorie. Robert Jr. served in the Philippines during World War II as a platoon leader in the 511th Parachute Infantry Regiment (United States) of the 11th Airborne Division. Despite both father and son fighting in their respective divisions in the Battle of Manila, neither would meet in combat until April in northern Luzon.

Beightler died on February 12, 1978. He is buried at Oakdale Cemetery in Marysville.

Beightler had said of his hometown "With you, I lived many of my greatest moments, from which I have many of my fondest memories. Memories of Marysville during my 28 years here are among my warmest thoughts."

Honors

Robert Beightler was the recipient of numerous honors, including the Distinguished Service Cross for his leadership in the Philippines campaign, the Silver Star Medal, the Purple Heart, the Combat Infantryman Badge, the Distinguished Service Medal for the New Georgia campaign, with an Oak Leaf cluster for his service in Bougainville and Luzon, and the Legion of Merit with an Oak Leaf cluster.  His award of the Combat Infantryman Badge (CIB) was later revoked because Army regulations prohibit the CIB from being awarded to generals.

On September 25, 1945, Beightler received his 33d degree from the Scottish Rite of Freemasonry. He was awarded the Legion of Honor from the Philippine government. In June 1952, Beightler was awarded an honorary doctorate from the University of the Ryukyus for his work in rebuilding the infrastructure. The National Guard armory in Columbus is named in his honor. It is the headquarters of the Ohio National Guard.

In 1969, the city of Marysville, Ohio dedicated 5th Street in honor of Beightler, naming it Major General Robert S. Beightler Way.
In 1993, the Ohio Department of Veterans Affairs inducted him into the Ohio Veterans Hall of Fame. In 2007, the Union County, Ohio Chamber of Commerce declared September 28 to be Major General Robert S. Beightler Day.

In 2007, the Ohio Historical Society dedicated an historical marker on 5th Street in Uptown Marysville in honor of Beightler. Hundreds of citizens attended the ceremony, with officials present from the office of Gov. Ted Strickland, U.S. Senator George Voinovich, and the Ohio National Guard. In 2007, the Ohio Department of Transportation funded his memorial marker at the Veterans Memorial in Marysville, Ohio.

Military decorations

Notes

References

 
 Kennedy-Ohl, John. Minuteman: The Military Career Of General Robert S. Beightler. Lynne Rienner Publishers, 2001. , 
 "Beightler family upholds military tradition". Marysville Journal-Tribune. 29 sept 2007. 8 dec 2008
 Ohio History: The Scholarly Journal of the Ohio Historical Society. Volume 106. Ohio Historical Society.
 Denslow, William R., and Harry S. Truman. 10,000 Famous Freemasons from A to J Part One. Kessinger Publishing, 2004. , 
 "Punitive Expedition". United States State Department. 8 dec 2008
 Horns, Ryan. "Honoring a hometown hero". Marysville Journal-Tribune. 29 sept 07. 8 dec 2008
 Cipriano Venzon, Anne. The United States in the First World War: An Encyclopedia. Taylor & Francis, 1995. , 
 "Robert Beightler Accepting Japanese's Surrender". Ohio Historical Society. Unknown. 8 dec 2008
 Chapin, USMCR (Ret), Captain John C. "TOP OF THE LADDER: Marine Operations in the Northern Solomons". National Park Service. Unknown. 8 dec 2008
 Kulawik, Christopher. " Mr. Republicans: Goldwater, Taft and a Usable Past in Mid-Century American". Columbia University. Unknown. 8 dec 2008
 "Class of 1993 - Ohio Veterans Hall of Fame ". Ohio Department of Veterans Affairs. Unknown. 8 dec 2008
 "Marysville set to honor one of Ohio's great Citizen-Soldiers". Ohio National Guard. 2007. 8 dec 2008
 "Index to Politicians: Beetham to Belch" Political Graveyard. Unknown. 9 dec 2008
 Wunderlin, Clarence.  The Papers of Robert A. Taft.  Kent State University Press, 1997.  , 
 Curry, Col. W.L.  History of Union County.  B.F. Bowen and Company. Indianapolis. 1915

External links
Generals of World War II

1892 births
1978 deaths
United States Army Infantry Branch personnel
United States Army War College alumni
United States Army Command and General Staff College alumni
People from Worthington, Ohio
People from Marysville, Ohio
Ohio State University College of Engineering alumni
Recipients of the Distinguished Service Cross (United States)
Recipients of the Distinguished Service Medal (US Army)
Recipients of the Silver Star
Recipients of the Legion of Merit
United States Army personnel of World War I
United States Army generals of World War II
United States Army generals
Military personnel from Ohio